Canalicular multispecific organic anion transporter 2 is a protein that in humans is encoded by the ABCC3 gene.

Function 

The protein encoded by this gene is a member of the superfamily of ATP-binding cassette (ABC) transporters. ABC proteins transport various molecules across extra- and intra-cellular membranes. ABC genes are divided into seven distinct subfamilies (ABC1, MDR/TAP, MRP, ALD, OABP, GCN20, White). This protein is a member of the MRP subfamily which is involved in multi-drug resistance. The specific function of this protein has not yet been determined; however, this protein may play a role in the transport of biliary and intestinal excretion of organic anions. Alternatively spliced variants which encode different protein isoforms have been described; however, not all variants have been fully characterized.

ABCC3 is induced as a hepatoprotective response to a variety of pathologic liver conditions. The constitutive androstane receptor, pregnane X receptor and nuclear factor (erythroid-derived 2)-like 2 (Nrf2) transcription factors are involved in mediating induction. A functional antioxidant response element in the 8th intron of the human ABCC3 gene appears responsible for Nrf2-mediated induction in response to oxidative stress.

Interactive pathway map

See also 
 ATP-binding cassette transporter

References

Further reading

External links 
 
 

ATP-binding cassette transporters